Yu Guozhen (俞國楨, 1852–1932) was a Presbyterian pastor and, in 1906, founded the independent Chinese Christian organization, the China Christian Independent Church.

References

1852 births
1932 deaths
Converts to Christianity
Chinese Protestant ministers and clergy
Founders of new religious movements
People from Yinzhou District, Ningbo